The Barber of Seville (French: Le Barbier de Séville) is a French film directed by Jean Loubignac released in 1948. It is a screen version of the 1816 opera by Rossini based on the 1775 play by Beaumarchais (in the translation by Castil-Blaze). Filmed at the Billancourt Studios it uses the Théâtre national de l'Opéra-Comique production of the time.

It was filmed in 1947, released in May 1948, and lasts around 95 minutes.

The opera had been seen at all the principal lyric theatres in Paris; at the Salle Favart it had been performed over 500 times by the time of the film, which features several popular singers from the company.

The film director is Jean Loubignac, director of photography René Colas, sets by Louis Le Barbenchon, and producer Claude Dolbert, for Codo-Cinéma.

Cast
Roger Bussonnet as Figaro
Raymond Amade as Almaviva
Lucienne Jourfier as Rosine
Louis Musy as Don Bartolo
Roger Bourdin as Don Bazile
Renée Gilly as Marceline
Jean Vieuille as Pédrille
Gustave Wion as L'Officier
Serge Rallier as L'Alcade
Jean Retty as Le Notaire

The chorus and orchestra of the Opéra-Comique are conducted by André Cluytens.

References

External links

Le Barbier de Séville at Ciné-Ressources

1948 films
1948 musical films
French musical films
Films directed by Jean Loubignac
Films based on The Barber of Seville
Films set in Seville
Films set in the 18th century
Films shot at Billancourt Studios
French black-and-white films
Opera films
1940s French films